Xinjiang Arts Institute is an arts college in Xinjiang. It is ranked at 521st in China, having a score of 15.00.

50th anniversary 
On September 26, 2008, Xinjiang Arts Institute held a conference to celebrate its 50th anniversary of establishment at Xinjiang People's Hall. Ismail Tiliwaldi, vice chairman of the Standing Committee of the National People’s Congress; Nur Bekri, deputy secretary of CPC Xinjiang Committee, chairman of Xinjiang Uygur Autonomous Region attended the celebration with university staff and students.

References

External links 
 Official site

1953 establishments in China
Universities and colleges in Xinjiang
Education in Ürümqi